The Botanischer Garten der Stadt Wilhelmshaven (8500 m2) is a municipal botanical garden located at Gökerstraße 125, Wilhelmshaven, Lower Saxony, Germany. It is open daily in the warmer months; admission is free.

The garden was established in 1947 as a school garden. Its major collection represents typical plants of northern Germany, from environments including heath, dunes, forests, meadows, and ponds. Other outdoor collections include a medicinal garden, ornamental plants, and thematically arranged areas. Its greenhouses contain plants from the Mediterranean, tropics, and subtropics including coffee, cocoa, bananas, sugarcane, rice, carnivorous plants, succulents, epiphytic bromeliads and orchids, and Victoria cruziana.

See also 
 List of botanical gardens in Germany

External links 
 Botanischer Garten der Stadt Wilhelmshaven
 Wilhelmshaven city page

Wilhelmshaven, Botanischer Garten der Stadt
Wilhelmshaven, Botanischer Garten der Stadt
Wilhelmshaven